Resurrection is the second album by the nu metal/rapcore music group Grade 8. The album was released on August 10, 2004 via Sound Barrier Records.

Track listing
 "Intro" – 1:58
 "Resurrection" – 2:30
 "Fighting Me" – 2:51
 "Everybody" – 2:55
 "Oxyrotten" – 3:05
 "Fallen Angel" – 3:04
 "Ignore" – 3:31
 "Agitated" – 3:24
 "Waiting" – 3:37
 "Serving Serpents" – 2:22
 "So Strong" – 3:03
 "Demons" – 2:27
 "I Don't Need" – 2:53

Personnel
 Ryan Tooker – Vocals
 Dustin Tooker – Guitar
 Stitch – Bass
 Wade Hagblom – Drums
 Aaron Zilch – Electronics

Production notes
 Mixed and engineered by Arty Congero
 Tracks 3 and 9 mixed by Toby Wright
 Produced by grade 8
 Executive producer David L.Fish

References

2004 albums
Grade 8 (band) albums